Pacanga District is one of three districts of the province Chepén in Peru.

References